Peter Molnar (August 25, 1943 – June 23, 2022) was a professor in Geological Sciences at the University of Colorado. His research focused on aspects of how mountain ranges form and continental lithosphere deforms.

Molnar was born August 25, 1943, in Pittsburgh, Pennsylvania.
He received a Bachelor of Arts degree in physics from Oberlin College in 1965 and his Ph.D. in seismology from Columbia University in 1970.

He was a winner of the Crafoord Prize and a fellow of the American Geophysical Union. He won the Crafoord Prize in 2014 for discovering "the driving forces behind plate motions and the place of continents in the plate tectonic model of Earth's evolution. Innovatively combining geological and geophysical methods of inquiry with satellite measurements and modelling, the Laureate has also paved the way to a new understanding of the formation of mountain ranges and their role in global tectonics."

References

External links
 Webpage
 http://www.colorado.edu/GeolSci/faculty/molnar.htm
 http://newsoffice.mit.edu/2014/peter-molnar-takes-down-popular-scientific-theory-john-carlson-lecture-1029

1943 births
2022 deaths
American geophysicists
Columbia University alumni
University of Colorado Boulder faculty
Massachusetts Institute of Technology faculty
Scientists from Pittsburgh
20th-century American geologists
21st-century American geologists